Malik Batmaz (born 17 March 2000) is a professional footballer who plays as a forward for Karlsruher SC. Born in Germany, he has represented Turkey at youth level.

Career
Batmaz made his professional debut for Karlsruher SC on 19 August 2018, appearing in the first round of the 2018–19 DFB-Pokal against Bundesliga side Hannover 96. He was substituted on in the 77th minute for Marvin Pourié, with the match finishing as a 6–0 home loss. On 13 January 2020, Batmaz moved to VfB Stuttgart II on loan for the rest of the season. He made three appearances and scored two goals, before returning to Karlsruher SC in the summer 2020.

References

External links
 
 
 

2000 births
Living people
People from Bretten
Sportspeople from Karlsruhe (region)
German people of Turkish descent
Footballers from Baden-Württemberg
Turkish footballers
German footballers
Association football forwards
Turkey youth international footballers
Karlsruher SC II players
Karlsruher SC players
VfB Stuttgart II players
2. Bundesliga players
3. Liga players
Oberliga (football) players